Jorge Isaacs Perlaza Aguiño (born 11 October 1985) is a Colombian footballer.

Club career

Colombia
Perlaza began his professional career in 2001 with Atlético Huila debuting with the club as a 16-year-old. In 2002, he moved to Deportes Quindío and played primarily with the reserve side. During the middle of the 2002 season Perlaza joined Deportivo Pasto and began to receive more playing time appearing in 34 matches and scoring his first two goals as a professional. In 2004, he rejoined Quindio and had a breakthrough season in 2006 scoring 8 goals in 26 matches. His play for Quindio led him to be called to the national team.

In 2007, he joined Deportes Tolima and continued his fine play. Perlaza was one of the top scorers in the 2010 Liga Postobon II scoring 10 goals as he helped Tolima qualify to the 2011 Copa Libertadores. While at Tolima Perlaza has participated in the Copa Libertadores in 2007 and the Copa Sudamericana in 2010 appearing in 14 matches and scoring 4 goals.

United States
During January 2011 it was reported that Perlaza would be trialing with MLS side Portland Timbers. Perlaza signed with Portland on 7 March 2011., and scored his first goals for the club – the first of which was the first ever home goal for the Timbers at the newly renovated Jeld-Wen Field – on 14 April 2011 in a 4–2 win over the Chicago Fire.

On 6 June 2012 Perlaza was traded to the Philadelphia Union in exchange for forward Danny Mwanga.

On 28 August 2012, upon mutual decision with Perlaza and management, Perlaza's contract was terminated by the Philadelphia Union after he appeared in just 2 games.

International career
Due to his form while with Deportes Quindío Perlaza was called up to the Colombia national football team in 2006.

Career statistics

Club

Updated 30 June 2012

References

External links

Profile at GolGolGol.net

1985 births
Living people
Colombian footballers
Colombian expatriate footballers
Colombia international footballers
Atlético Huila footballers
Deportes Quindío footballers
Deportivo Pasto footballers
Deportes Tolima footballers
Portland Timbers players
Philadelphia Union players
Millonarios F.C. players
Expatriate soccer players in the United States
Categoría Primera A players
Major League Soccer players
Association football forwards
Sportspeople from Cauca Department
21st-century Colombian people